State Route 60 (SR 60) is a north-south major state route in Eastern Tennessee.

Route description

Bradley County

SR 60 begins at the Georgia border in Bradley County, heading north on two-lane Dalton Pike, a primary state route. At the state line, the route continues into Whitfield County, Georgia as SR 71 (Cleveland Highway) to Dalton. From the border, SR 60 passes a mix of hilly farmland and woodland as it reaches a junction with SR 317 (Weatherly Switch Road). The route continues through the agricultural valley, entering the community of Waterville, where it widens to five lanes. Continuing northeast, the road enters Cleveland and passes residential development as it turns to the north. SR 60 heads into commercial areas and intersection with McGrady Drive, a connector to APD-40 (US 64 Bypass/US 74, SR 311), where it reduces back to two lanes. The road heads northwest into residential areas, turning north into business areas, and intersects SR 74 (Spring Place Road S.E.). TDOT lists the route as turning southeast to form a concurrency with Spring Place Road, but it is signed on some maps as continuing north with SR 74 at this intersection along Wildwood Avenue SE. and then east with US 64 to the interchange with APD-40.

A short distance later, SR 60 splits from SR 74 by heading north along APD-40 as part of the four-lane divided and limited-access highway, becoming a primary route again. The road passes through wooded areas near some residential development, bypassing Cleveland to the east. Upon reaching a cloverleaf interchange with US 64/US 74 (SR 40), US 64 Bypass terminates and SR 60 continues north as a freeway. The route comes to an interchange with Benton Pike before coming to the Overhead Bridge Road exit, at which point the freeway temporarily gains auxiliary lanes. SR 60 passes over Norfolk Southern's Knoxville District West End railroad line and interchanges with 20th Street NE, where the auxiliary lanes terminate, making a turn to the northwest. The road then enters the metropolis of Cleveland, passing developed areas of homes and businesses as it becomes a surface road again. Here the APD-40 designation ends and the route becomes known as 25th Street. SR 60 comes to intersections with US 11 (SR 74, Ocoee Street) and US 11 Bypass (SR 2, Keith Street) in this area. The road passes through a patch of woods before passing more commercial establishments as it comes to the I-75 interchange.

At this point, SR 60 turns north and becomes Georgetown Road, a secondary route that passes through residential areas, where it narrows into a two-lane undivided road. The route comes to an intersection with Paul Huff Parkway, and leaves Cleveland, heading into a mix of farmland and woodland before passing near more residential and commercial areas as it comes to the SR 306 junction in Hopewell. Following this, the road continues northwest through forested areas with some farm fields and residences. SR 60 continues into more agricultural areas before it travels along the border between Meigs County to the northeast and Hamilton County to the southwest.

Hamilton and Meigs Counties

The route passes through Georgetown, where it passes a few residences and businesses. A short distance past Georgetown, SR 60 passes crosses onto the Hamilton-Meigs County line, passing through more rural areas as an unnamed road and comes to a junction with SR 58. The road passes through more agricultural and wooded areas, turning to the north and entering more forested surroundings. After a turn to the northwest, the route continues through wooded areas with a few farm fields fully within Hamilton County, reaching an intersection with SR 312 (Birchwood Pike). At this point, SR 60 turns north again and passes through the residential community of Birchwood. From here, the road becomes Hiwassee Highway and curves northwest into farmland with some woods and homes, crossing into Meigs County.

Rhea County

Upon crossing the Tennessee River on the Tri-County Veterans Bridge, SR 60 enters Rhea County and turns north into forested areas with a few farms. The road continues to wind through rural areas with some residential development before SR 60 reaches its northern terminus at US 27 (SR 29) in Dayton.

History

In Cleveland, the route originally turned south about 1/4 mile east of the interchange with I-75 onto a road which is still called Georgetown Road, and briefly ran together with US 64 through downtown Cleveland before splitting off onto Wildwood Avenue. It was moved onto 25th Street after it was widened to four lanes in the mid 1960s and APD-40 after that section was completed in 1974. Originally, the route did not cross the Tennessee river into Rhea County, and commuters used Blythe Ferry, which dated back to the early 1800s. In 1994, the current bridge across the river was completed, and Blythe Ferry closed.

Between early 2010 and early 2013, the section of SR 60 (Dalton Pike) south of the intersection with McGrady Drive through the Waterville community was widened to five lanes and straightened out. The original route was a hazardous two-lane road with several dangerous curves prone to accidents.

In 2016, the parallel bridges on APD-40 across 20th Street, the railroad, and Overhead Bridge Road were designated as the Dustin Ledford Memorial Bridge in honor of a man who was killed by an intoxicated driver near the Overhead Bridge Road exit.

In September 2017, TDOT began the process of right-of-way acquisition to widen the segment of SR 60 (Georgetown Road) between north of I-75 and SR 306 from two to five lanes. After years of delays, the project broke ground on October 14, 2021, with completion expected on August 25, 2025.

Major intersections

References

 
060
Transportation in Bradley County, Tennessee
Transportation in Hamilton County, Tennessee
Transportation in Meigs County, Tennessee
Transportation in Rhea County, Tennessee
Freeways in Tennessee